Kirk Chambers (born March 19, 1979) is a former American football offensive tackle. He played college football at Stanford and was drafted by the Cleveland Browns in the sixth round of the 2004 NFL Draft. He was also a member of the Buffalo Bills, Cincinnati Bengals, Detroit Lions and Atlanta Falcons before becoming a high school football coach in the 2010s.

Early years
Chambers graduated from Provo High School in 1997. For three years he started both on offense and defense. He was a member of championship winning basketball teams at Provo High in 1995 and 1997. Chambers also participated in student government, Mr. Provo High, track and field, and the Chamber Choir.

A distinguished high school athlete, Chambers was heavily recruited by Stanford University and by his home town school Brigham Young University, eventually selecting the Cardinal.

Before playing at Stanford, however, Chambers served a two-year church mission for the Church of Jesus Christ of Latter-day Saints in Berlin, Germany.

College career
Chambers started all 45 games in which he played for Stanford University.

Professional career

Cleveland Browns
Chambers was drafted in the sixth round of the 2004 NFL Draft by the Cleveland Browns. He spent two seasons with the team, appearing in 21 games with no starts.

Buffalo Bills
After spending the 2006 season out of football, Chambers signed a free-agent contract with the Buffalo Bills on January 25, 2007. He played in all 32 games for the team over the following two season, starting five.

Chambers re-signed with the Bills in March 2009. He was released during final cuts on September 5, only to be re-signed three days later after offensive tackle Langston Walker was released. He was again released during the final cuts on September 4, 2010.

Cincinnati Bengals
He was signed by the Cincinnati Bengals on November 16, 2010.

Detroit Lions
On August 11, 2011, Chambers signed with the Detroit Lions. Chambers was released from the Lions on the final day of cuts.

Atlanta Falcons
The Atlanta Falcons signed him on October 25, 2011.

Personal life
His father was a high school German teacher, so Chambers speaks fluent German. He also earned the rank of Eagle Scout while a member in the Boy Scouts of America.

He is a member of the Church of Jesus Christ of Latter-day Saints.

After the 2011 NFL Season Chambers chose to become the head football coach at Spanish Fork High School in Spanish Fork, Utah. In April 2015, he resigned as head football coach at Spanish Fork High School to become a Co-Athletic Director with Phil Olsen at Provo High School.

References

1979 births
Living people
American Mormon missionaries in Germany
20th-century Mormon missionaries
Sportspeople from Provo, Utah
Provo High School alumni
Players of American football from Utah
American football offensive tackles
American football offensive guards
Stanford Cardinal football players
Cleveland Browns players
Buffalo Bills players
Cincinnati Bengals players
Detroit Lions players
Atlanta Falcons players
Latter Day Saints from Utah